Roland Stephen Owie is from Ilobi village in isi community, he was elected Senator for the Edo South Senatorial District of Edo State, Nigeria at the start of the Nigerian Fourth Republic, running on the People's Democratic Party (PDP) platform. He took office on 29 May 1999. Owie was the pioneer chief whip of the senate after forming a formidable team with then President of the Senate, Chuba Okadigbo.  Prior to him being a senator, he was elected into the House of Representative in 1979
 
After taking his seat in the Senate he was appointed to committees on Selection, Senate Services, Power & Steel, Agriculture, Water Resources and Drug & Narcotics.

References

Living people
People from Edo State
Peoples Democratic Party members of the Senate (Nigeria)
Year of birth missing (living people)
20th-century Nigerian politicians
21st-century Nigerian politicians